Altınordu Futbol Kulübü (formerly known as Altınordu Spor Kulübü) is a Turkish professional football club based in İzmir. It was founded in 1923 as a breakaway from Altay SK. Team colours are red and navy. The club also had a basketball team and played in Turkish Basketball League and Turkish Basketball Championship. They have two Turkish basketball titles: Turkish Basketball Championship in 1967 and Basketball Super League in 1966–67 season. Currently the club focuses on youth development of local talent, exclusively fielding Turkish football players as principle.

History
Another club founded out of Altay SK is Göztepe S.K. in 1925. Altınordu merged with Altay SK and Bucaspor between 1937–1939 and renamed as Üçokspor. Altınordu played in the First League between 1959 and 1965 and between 1966 and 1970. The team declined slowly after 1968 and relegated to the third league in 1978. It returned to the second league the next year and remained 13 seasons in it. It declined again since 1991 and lost her professional status in 1995–96 season.

It regained one league after matches of Amateur Football Championship in Trabzon in 2003. The team's performance improved season by season and it missed directly promotion by goal difference only against Konya Şekerspor in the third group of the third league in 2007–08 season. It participated in extra play-off matches in Trabzon and was promoted to the second league (which is the third tier of the Turkish League) after beating both Bingöl Belediyespor and Keçiörengücü by 1–0. However, the spell in the second league was not successful and the team was again relegated to the third league after drawing with Fethiyespor 2–2 at an away match on 9 May.

League participations
 Turkish Super League: 1959–65, 1966–70
 TFF First League: 1965–66, 1970–78, 1979–92, 2014–
 TFF Second League: 1978–79, 1992–96, 2008–09, 2011–12, 2013–14
 TFF Third League: 2003–08, 2009–11, 2012–2013
 Amateur League: 1925–59, 1996–03

Honours

Football
 
 Play-off Runners-up (1) 2020–21
 Turkish Football Championship
 Runners-up (3): 1927, 1932, 1935

Basketball
 Turkish Basketball Championship
 Winners (1): 1967
 Basketball Super League
 Winners (1): 1966-67
 Turkish Basketball Cup
 Winners (1): 1967-68

Players

Current squad

Other players under contract

Out on loan

References

External links

Official website
Official English website
Altınordu on TFF.org

Football clubs in Turkey
Association football clubs established in 1923
1923 establishments in Turkey
Sports teams in İzmir
Süper Lig clubs